Sanvrad  is a village in Ladnun tehsil of Nagaur district in Rajasthan, India. Saraad is 107 km east of Nagaur district and 22 km south of Ladnun Tehsil headquarters. It has nearly 400 houses. It was founded before 1190.

The village attracted national attention due to Anandpal Singh Chouhan.

References

External links

Villages in Nagaur district